VSS-UNES-USU (from the , , and ) is the national students' union of Switzerland. Established in 1920, it is an  umbrella organization of students' unions of most Swiss higher education institutions and represents the interests of students at the federal level.

VSS-UNES-USU is a member of the European Students' Union.

External links

Education in Switzerland
Student organisations in Switzerland
Groups of students' unions